Jean-Philippe Vassal (born 22 February 1954) is a French architect and academic. He runs the architectural practice Lacaton & Vassal, with Anne Lacaton. The pair were jointly awarded the 2021 Pritzker Architecture Prize.

Early life and education 
Vassal was born 1954 in Casablanca during the French Protectorate of Morocco. He graduated from the École nationale supérieure d'architecture et de paysage de Bordeaux in 1980. After graduating, he spent five years in Niger as an architect and town planner.

Architectural practice 

Vassal founded the practice Lacaton & Vassal with Anne Lacaton in Bordeaux in 1987, which moved to Paris in 2000. The work of Lacaton & Vassel focuses on reduced-cost construction. Lacaton & Vassel carried out many international projects in the area of housing. They accomplish the high-profile renovation of the Palais de Tokyo in Paris.

In 2019 the Grand Parc Bordeaux (with Frédéric Druot and Christophe Hutin) was selected winner of the European Union's 2019 Mies van der Rohe Award, for the best contemporary architecture in Europe.

The French architects, who are based in the Paris suburb of Montreuil, believe that every structure can be repurposed, reinvented, reinvigorated.

Academic career 
Vassal has been visiting professor at institutes such as the Architecture School of Versailles (2002–2006), the École Polytechnique Fédérale de Lausanne (EPF Lausanne; 2010–11), the Technische Universität Berlin (TU Berlin; 2007–10) and Universität der Künste Berlin (UDK Berlin; since 2012).

Awards and honours: Lacaton & Vassal 
 1991: Lauréats des Albums de la Jeune Architecture, France
 1999: Grand Prix National d'Architecture Jeune Talent, France
 2006: Schelling Architecture Award, Germany
 2006: Sustainability and innovation in housing, Erich Schelling Foundation
 2008: Grand Prix National d'Architecture
 2009: French International Fellow of the Royal Institute of British Architects
 2011: Paris Daylight & Building Components Award
 2011: Prix de l'Équerre d'Argent (with )
 2014: Rolf Schock Prize, Fine arts category
 2016: Simon Architecture Prize/ Fondation Mies Van der Rohe – The Living Places (with Frederic Druot)
 2016: Life Time Achievement – Trienal de Arquitectura de Lisboa
 2016: Gold medal of the Académie d'architecture
 2016: Heinrich Tessenow Medal, Germany
 2019: Mies van der Rohe Prize
 2020: Grand BDA Prize for their life's work
 2021: Pritzker Prize

References

External links
 – video interviews, philosophy, and work retrospective.

1954 births
Living people
20th-century French architects
21st-century French architects
People from Casablanca
Pritzker Architecture Prize winners
Members of the Royal Swedish Academy of Arts